Christine Quintasket or Hum-ishu-ma, better known by her author name Mourning Dove, was a Native American (Okanogan (Syilx), Arrow Lakes (Sinixt), and Colville) author best known for her 1927 novel Cogewea, the Half-Blood: A Depiction of the Great Montana Cattle Range and her 1933 work Coyote Stories.

Cogewea was one of the first novels to be written by a Native American woman and to feature a female protagonist. It explores the lives of Cogewea, a mixed-blood heroine whose ranching skills, riding prowess, and bravery are noted and greatly respected by the primarily mixed-race cowboys on the ranch on the Flathead Indian Reservation. The eponymous main character hires a greenhorn easterner, Alfred Densmore, who has designs on Cogewea's land, which she had received as head of household in an allotment under the Dawes Act.

Coyote Stories (1933) is a collection of what Mourning Dove called Native American folklore.

Name
She was born Christine Quintasket circa 1884 or at some time between 1884 and  1888. Quintasket was a surname her father had taken from his stepfather. She also was given an indigenous name, Hum-Ishu-Ma.

Early in her life, Quintasket was forced to give up her language while attending the Sacred Heart School at the Goodwin Mission in Ward, near Kettle Falls, Washington. As a child, she could not remember the meaning of her Native name, but thought it meant Mourning Dove. She realized that she at first spelled it incorrectly in English as "Morning Dove" after seeing a bird labeled as a mourning dove in a museum; she then changed the spelling to "Mourning Dove."
But later in life she said, "the whiteman must have invented the name for it," after realizing that her people did not give women bird or animal names.

Background
Hum-Ishu-Ma, also known as Christine Quintasket, was born "in the Moon of Leaves" (April) 1888 in a canoe on the Kootenai River near Bonners Ferry, Idaho.

Her mother Lucy Stukin was of Sinixt (Lakes) and Colville (Skoyelpi) ancestry. Lucy was the daughter of Sinixt Chief Seewhelken and a Colville woman. Christine spent much time with her maternal Colville grandmother, learning storytelling from her.

Christine's father was Joseph Quintasket, a mixed-race Okanagan. His mother Nicola was Okanagan and his father was Irish. He grew up with his mother and stepfather. While living at the Colville Reservation, Christine Quintasket was enrolled as Sinixt (Lakes), but she identified as Okanogan. The tribes shared related languages and some culture.

Hum-Ishu-Ma learned English in school. After reading The Brand: A Tale of the Flathead Reservation by Theresa Broderick, she was inspired to become a writer. She wanted to refute Broderick's derogatory view of indigenous people. Her command of the English language made her valued by her fellow Natives, and she advised local Native leaders. She also became active in Native politics. She helped the Okanogan tribe to gain money that was owed them.

Personal life
Quintasket married Hector McLeod, a member of the Flathead people. But he proved to be an abusive husband; they separated. In 1919, she married again, to Fred Galler of the Wenatchi.

Quintasket died on 8 August 1936 at the state hospital in Medical Lake, Washington.

Cogewea, the Half-Blood

Mourning Dove's 1927 novel explores a theme common in early Native American fiction: the plight of the mixedblood (or "breed"), who lives in both white and Indian cultures. Typically mixed-race Native Americans had Indian mothers and white fathers. Many such unions originated between fur traders or trappers and indigenous women. Later other explorers also married Native American women. There were strong alliances created between tribes and traders in the marriage of their daughters to Europeans.

In the novel, Cogewea has two sisters Julia (older) and Mary. After their Okanogan mother dies, their white father leaves them to join the Alaskan gold rush, joining tens of thousands of men migrating there. Their maternal grandmother Stemteemä raises the girls as Okanogan. After Julia marries a white rancher, she takes in her younger sisters at his ranch located within the boundaries of the Flathead Indian Reservation. (Many whites purchased properties within reservations in the West.)

Cogewea is soon courted by Alfred Densmore, a white suitor from the East Coast, and James LaGrinder, the ranch foreman, who is mixed race. Her sisters had opposing views of these men: Julia approves of Densmore but Mary is suspicious of him. Cogewea and Jim reach a happy ending.

Background
Mourning Dove collaborated on this work with her editor Lucullus Virgil McWhorter, a white man who studied and advocated for Native Americans.

Mourning Dove was a new author, and she felt that McWhorter as editor greatly changed her book. In one of her letters to him, she wrote:

"I have just got through going over the book 'Cogewea,' and am surprised at the changes that you made. I think they are fine, and you made a tasty dressing like a cook would do with a fine meal. I sure was interested in the book, and hubby read it over and also all the rest of the family neglected their housework till they read it cover to cover. I felt like it was some one else's book and not mine at all. In fact the finishing touches are put there by you, and I have never seen it".

Mourning Dove agreed to the changes, later writing to him: "My book of Cogewea would never have been anything but the cheap foolscap paper that it was written on if you had not helped me get it in shape. I can never repay you back."

The novel is one of the earliest written by a Native American woman and published in the United States, and one of the earliest novels by a Native American to feature a female protagonist. It followed Wynema, a Child of the Forest (1891) by Muscogee (Creek) author Sophia Alice Callahan, which was rediscovered in the late 20th century and published in 1997 in a scholarly edition.

A scholarly edition of Cogewea was published by the University of Nebraska Press in 1981 and has yet to be out of print.

Coyote Stories
In 1933, Mourning Dove published Coyote Stories, a collection of legends told to her by her grandmother and other tribal elders.

The foreword by Chief Standing Bear in this book includes these words: "These legends are of America, as are its mountains, rivers, and forests, and as are its people. They belong!"

Literary influences
Mourning Dove learned storytelling from her maternal grandmother, and from Teequalt, an elder who lived with her family when the girl was young.  She was also influenced by pulp-fiction novels, which her adopted brother Jimmy Ryan let her read.  She cited the novel The Brand: A Tale of the Flathead Reservation by Therese Broderick as inspiring her to begin writing. She was moved to counter what she thought was a derogatory representation of indigenous culture in Broderick's novel.

Works
Cogewea: The Half-Blood (1927)
Coyote Stories (1933) (27 stories) (229 pages)
In Spanish as: Cuentos Indios del Coyote, Paloma Triste (Mourning Dove)
Shorter (17 stories) English version as: Mourning Dove's Stories (117 pages) (1991)
Tales of the Okanogans (1976)
Mourning Dove: A Salishan Autobiography (1990)

See also
List of writers from peoples indigenous to the Americas
Native American Studies

Notes

References

Further reading
Bataille, Gretchen M., Native American Women: a Biographical Dictionary, pp. 178–179.
Bloom, Harold, Native American Women Writers, pp. 69–82.
Buck, Claire, The Bloomsbury Guide to Women's Literature, p. 838.
Witales, Janet, et al., Native North American Literary Companion.
Arnold, Laurie, "More than Mourning Dove: Christine Quintasket – Activist, Leader, Public Intellectual," Montana: The Magazine of Western History.

External links

"Mourning Dove", HistoryLink, biography and several photographs of the writer
"Mourning Dove", Native American Author's Project, Internet Public Library
Bibliography of scholarship on Mourning Dove
"Empowering Indigenous Women through Literature and Publishing", Cogewea blog, includes history of publication and photo
Biography online.
Therese Broderick, The Brand: Tale of the Flathead Reservation, (Seattle: Alice Harriman Company, 1909), novel available free online

1880s births
1936 deaths
20th-century American novelists
20th-century American women writers
20th-century Native American women
20th-century Native Americans
American women novelists
Native American novelists
Native American women writers
People from Boundary County, Idaho
Novelists from Idaho
Deaths from influenza
American people of Irish descent
Sinixt
Okanagan
Interior Salish
Colville people
Syilx people
Folklore writers